This is a list of members elected to the ninth Parliament of Uganda (2011 to 2016) in the 2011 general election. It was preceded by the eighth Parliament and succeeded by the tenth Parliament.

Composition 
The Ninth Parliament was presided over by Rebecca Kadaga as Speaker, with Jacob Oulanyah as Deputy Speaker.

Elected members

Ex officio members

References 
 

Parliament of Uganda
Lists of political office-holders in Uganda